The 2011 NACAC Cross Country Championships was the seventh edition of the continental cross country running competition which took place on February 19 at Queen's Park Savannah in Port of Spain, Trinidad and Tobago. A total of 166 athletes took part in the event, hailing from a record high of 20 nations within the North America, Central America and Caribbean region.

The competition featured four races: an 8 km senior men's race, a 6 km senior women's race, a 6 km junior (under-20s) men's race and a 4 km junior women's race. The course for the championships followed a 2-kilometer grassy loop and was relatively flat throughout. Kenyan-born runner Robert Cheseret won the senior men's gold for the United States and also led the Americans to the team title. Canadian Kathryn Harrison secured the senior women's title, but the United States took the overall senior women's gold medals. Ross Proudfoot led a Canadian sweep of the medals in the junior men's race, while American Chelsea Orr was the junior women's gold medalist.

Medallists
Complete results were published.

Individual

Team

Medal table (unofficial)

Note: Totals include both individual and team medals, with medals in the team competition counting as one medal.

Participation
According to an unofficial count, 121 athletes from 19 countries participated.

 (2)
 (1)
 (8)
 (21)
 (1)
 (1)
 (4)
 (2)
 (2)
 (1)
 (7)
 (13)
 México (7)
 (1)
 (12)
 (4)
 (4)
 (11)
 (19)

See also
 2011 in athletics (track and field)

References

NACAC Cross Country
NACAC Cross Country Championships
2011 in Caribbean sport
International athletics competitions hosted by Trinidad and Tobago
NACAC Cross Country Championships
Athletics competitions in the Caribbean
Cross country running in Trinidad and Tobago